Naini Central Prison or Naini Jail at Naini, near Prayagraj, is one of the most important prisons, and correctional Institutions in Uttar Pradesh, built during the British Raj.

Independence movement history
It became famous in pre-independence era, when many freedom fighters, including Motilal Nehru (1930), Pt. Jawahar Lal Nehru (1930, March 1945), the first Prime Minister of India, Govind Ballabh Pant, Narendra Dev, Rafi Ahmed Kidwai, Hasrat Mohani were imprisoned during Indian independence movement. Jawaharlal Nehru during his stay, wrote a series of letters to his young daughter Indira from the prison, starting on his thirteenth birthday till 9 August 1933, which were later published as  Glimpses of World History 

On 1 March 1941, Mahatma Gandhi visited the Jail as he called on imprisoned freedom fighters, Vijayalakshmi Pandit and Abul Kalam Azad.

Also Indira Gandhi, Nehru's daughter and a later Prime Minister of India was arrested along with her husband Feroze Gandhi, and spent her prison term here, from 11 September 1942 until 13 May 1943

Recent news
Lately, it has witnessed security concerns as it houses, not just a few Members of Parliament, but sharpshooters and gang lords from Purvanchal, including Sujeet Belwa and Rajesh Yadav, and rumours that gang wars were being raged from inside the prison. Apart from that many militants belonging to the Jaish-e-Mohammad and Lashkar-e-Taiba are also imprisoned here.

In 2008, the prison made news again, when 97 prisoners who had already completed their 14-year sentence, wrote to the President asking for euthanasia

After health concerns in the prison in 2008 when 17 inmates died over a period of five months, and as many as 239 inmates, were found to be suffering from ailments like tuberculosis, scabies and water-borne diseases, the government has taken measure to improve health services available to the inmates in the prison.

References

External links
 Uttar Pradesh Police, Official website
 Naini Central Jail Location

Prisons in Uttar Pradeh
Buildings and structures in Allahabad
Indian independence movement in Uttar Pradesh